Greenville City Hall in Greenville, Alabama is a historic city hall.  The building was designed by Montgomery architect Moreland Griffith Smith, and built in 1936–37 by workers from the Works Progress Administration.  The building is designed in a Colonial Revival style with Palladian influences, a popular style in the 1930s due to the recent restoration of Colonial Williamsburg.  It was built on the site of a grammar school that was originally built in the 1890s, but burned in the early 1920s and again in 1927.  The building is constructed of brick, with a full-height portico around the main entry.  Each window on the first floor is topped with an ashlar keystone.  The corners of the main block are adorned with stone quoins.  The building was listed on the National Register of Historic Places in 1986.

References

National Register of Historic Places in Butler County, Alabama
Colonial Revival architecture in Alabama
Government buildings completed in 1936
Buildings and structures in Butler County, Alabama
Greenville, Alabama
City and town halls on the National Register of Historic Places in Alabama